Ezequiel Elías Umeres (born 10 December 1995) is an Argentine professional footballer who plays as a forward for Plaza Colonia.

Career
Umeres' career started in 2015 with Estudiantes in the Argentine Primera División. He made his professional debut on 17 April during a 1–1 draw with Rosario Central at the Estadio Julio Humberto Grondona. That was his only appearance in 2015, Umeres went on to make eight more appearances throughout 2016 and 2016–17 for Estudiantes. He failed to feature during 2017–18 and subsequently departed the club in January 2018 to join Uruguayan Segunda División side Plaza Colonia. He scored his first senior goal on 18 August versus Villa Teresa, in a season which ended with promotion to the 2019 Uruguayan Primera División.

After goals against Defensor Sporting and Rampla Juniors in the top-flight for Plaza Colonia as they secured Copa Sudamericana qualification, Umeres returned to Argentina with Guillermo Brown in January 2020. He made two appearances, before the league's curtailment due to the COVID-19 pandemic. In October 2020, Umeres rejoined Plaza Colonia.

Career statistics
.

References

External links

1995 births
Living people
People from General López Department
Argentine footballers
Association football forwards
Argentine expatriate footballers
Expatriate footballers in Uruguay
Argentine expatriate sportspeople in Uruguay
Argentine Primera División players
Uruguayan Segunda División players
Uruguayan Primera División players
Primera Nacional players
Estudiantes de La Plata footballers
Plaza Colonia players
Guillermo Brown de Puerto Madryn footballers
Sportspeople from Santa Fe Province